A waveform is the shape and form of a wave.

Waveform may also refer to:

Corneal Waveform technology, technology of ophthalmology
Hello Waveforms, 2006 album by  British musician William Orbit
WAV, the  Waveform Audio File Format 
Waveform Records, an American record label
Waveform (video game), a 2012 puzzle game
Waveform (podcast), a podcast started in 2019 by Marques Brownlee